= Romsa =

Romsa may refer to:

- Tromsø, city, Romsa in Northern Sami
- Troms, county, Romsa in Northern Sami
